Galina Aleksandrovna Alekseyeva (born 27 October 1947) is a Soviet former diver who competed in the 1964 Summer Olympics and 1968 Summer Olympics.

References

External links
Profile at Infosport.ru 

1947 births
Living people
Divers from Moscow
Soviet female divers
Olympic divers of the Soviet Union
Divers at the 1964 Summer Olympics
Divers at the 1968 Summer Olympics
Olympic bronze medalists for the Soviet Union
Olympic medalists in diving
Medalists at the 1964 Summer Olympics
Dynamo sports society athletes